Eatonia is a small town in the Province of Saskatchewan, Canada with a population of 449 people (according to the Canada 2006 Census).  The town's economy is based almost exclusively on agriculture.  Eatonia is in southwest Saskatchewan at the crossroads of Highways 21 and 44, approximately 44 kilometers southwest of Kindersley and 72 kilometres from the provincial boundary with Alberta. The town is served by Eatonia (Elvie Smith) Municipal Airport.

History

Eatonia was founded in 1919 as a station on the Canadian National Railway and was named after Timothy Eaton, founder of the Eaton's department store chain and catalogue, and to honour his son and heir, John Craig Eaton.  The station was originally simply called "Eaton", but there was confusion with nearby Eston, so the name was changed to Eatonia in 1921 ("Eatonia" was the name of an Eaton's brand for clothing and other goods, and "Eatonian" was the name given to long-serving Eaton's employees).

Eatonia was incorporated as a town in 1954. In 1955, the year of Saskatchewan's Golden Jubilee, Eatonia's train station was featured on the cover of the Eaton's catalogue, thus resulting in a classic local image finding its way into homes across the country.  The former CN train station is now home to the Wheatland Regional Library (Eatonia Branch).  The former station, along with a train caboose and a wood-frame house ordered from the Eaton's catalogue in 1917, comprise the Eatonia Heritage Park, a  Municipal Heritage Property located at the south end of Main Street.

Demographics 

Education
Eatonia is home to a kindergarten to Grade 12 public school, Eaton School, which has been home to many successful volleyball, basketball, and football teams throughout its history. It is located within the Sun West School Division.

References

External links

Towns in Saskatchewan
Eaton's